Stuart Little is a mixed live-action and computer-animated American film franchise based on the 1945 children's novel of the same name by E. B. White. The films are produced by Franklin / Waterman Productions and released by Columbia Pictures.

The franchise follows the adventures of Stuart Little, an orphan mouse who is adopted into a human family and embarks on life-changing adventures.

Films

Stuart Little (1999)

Stuart (voiced by Michael J. Fox) is an anthropomorphic mouse who is adopted into a human family. His new parents, (Geena Davis, Hugh Laurie) are thrilled with him, but everyone else is not. Through a series of adventures he eventually gains the love of his big brother George, (Jonathan Lipnicki), acceptance by the extended Little family, and even the grudging tolerance of the family cat Snowbell (voiced by Nathan Lane), who is a member of an alley cat Mafia-like gang that wants to kill Stuart.

Stuart Little 2 (2002)

In the sequel, Stuart and his brother George (Jonathan Lipnicki) are attending school together, but his mother (Geena Davis) doesn't seem to think Stuart is capable of taking care of himself. Later, Stuart meets a bird named Margalo (voiced by Melanie Griffith) who he unintentionally saves from an evil Falcon (voiced by James Woods) and eventually becomes smitten with. But one day when Margalo is nowhere to be found, Stuart and Snowbell (voiced by Nathan Lane) team up to go and find her.

Stuart Little 3: Call of the Wild (2005)

In the third film, Stuart (Michael J. Fox) and his family are spending their summer vacation in a cabin near the fictional Lake Garland. Stuart signs up to be a lake-scout in an attempt to prove to his mother (Geena Davis) that he doesn't need to be watched over all the time. Soon, Stuart meets a new friend: a skunk named Reeko (Wayne Brady) whom he quickly befriends. But when a ferocious mountain lion named the Beast (Virginia Madsen) hatches a plot to eat Snowbell (Kevin Schon), Stuart must gather up all his courage to save him.

Possible reboot
It was reported by the Tracking Board and Zimbio that a new Stuart Little film was in development by Sony Pictures Animation and Red Wagon Productions with Douglas Wick and Lucy Fisher returning as the producers. Similar to the first two films, it will feature a combination of live-action and computer animation. The reboot will not be a sequel to the previous films and is said to be in the vein of a John Hughes film.

It has been stated that the film will be a more faithful adaptation of the E.B. White novel than the previous films, and was originally set to be released in either 2018 or 2019. As of 2021, the film's status remains unknown.

Television

Video games
Various video games based on Stuart Little were produced, but were mostly based on the films. Stuart Little: Big City Adventures based on the 1999 film, was released for Microsoft Windows in 1999. Stuart Little: The Journey Home based on the 1999 film, was released exclusively for the Game Boy Color in 2001. A game based on Stuart Little 2 was released for the PlayStation, Game Boy Advance, and Microsoft Windows in 2002. A third game, entitled Stuart Little 3: Big Photo Adventure was released exclusively for the PlayStation 2 in 2005, although it is not related to the film Stuart Little 3: Call of the Wild.

Reception

Critical response

Box office performance

Cast and crew

Principal cast

 A dark gray cell indicates the character was not featured in the film.
 A  indicates a performance through voice-over work.

Additional crew

References

External links
 
 
 

 
Film series introduced in 1999
Children's film series
Comedy film franchises
American film series
Columbia Pictures franchises
Sony Pictures franchises
Films based on American novels
Films based on children's books
Adaptations of works by E. B. White
Trilogies